Oxythecta acceptella is a moth of the family Oecophoridae. It is found in Australia.

References

Oecophorinae
Moths of Australia
Moths described in 1864